Men's Pan American Cup may refer to
 Men's Pan American Cup (field hockey)
 Men's Pan American Cup (volleyball)